Eupithecia nevadata is a moth in the family Geometridae first described by Alpheus Spring Packard in 1871. It is found in western North America.

The wingspan is about 20 mm. The forewings are pale grey with various reddish brown patches along the costa.

The larvae feed on Purshia and Ceanothus species.

Subspecies
Eupithecia nevadata nevadata (Nevada, California)
Eupithecia nevadata geneura Swett & Cassino, 1919 (Utah, Colorado)
Eupithecia nevadata morensata Cassino & Swett, 1922 (southern California)

References

Moths described in 1871
nevadata
Moths of North America